San Juan Bautista State Historic Park is a California state park encompassing the historic center of San Juan Bautista, California, United States.  It preserves a significant concentration of buildings dating to California's period of Spanish and Mexican control.  It includes the Mission San Juan Bautista, the Jose Castro House, and several other buildings facing the historic plaza. It became a state park in 1933 and was declared a National Historic Landmark in 1970.  It is also a site on the Juan Bautista de Anza National Historic Trail.

History and features
Mission San Juan Bautista was founded in 1797, as the 15th Spanish mission in what is now California.  It was well sited for its intended purpose, the conversion of area Native Americans to Roman Catholicism, and was highly successful.  The present mission church, still an active Catholic parish, was built in 1803-12, and is one of the largest of California's mission churches.  Across the plaza from the mission is the Plaza Hotel, which was originally built in 1814 as a barracks for Spanish soldiers.  Its second story was added in 1858, giving it a Monterey Colonial flavor.

Following the independence of Mexico, the Spanish missions were secularized in 1833, and the village around the mission became a pueblo.  On the west side of the plaza stands the adobe of José Antonio Castro, one of the most important figures in California's Mexican period between 1835 and 1846.  Built 1839-41, it is architecturally an important example of the Monterey Colonial style, and now functions as a museum.  Also nearby is the Juan de Anza House, an adobe whose construction predates the rise of the Monterey Colonial style.

See also

List of California state parks
List of National Historic Landmarks in California
National Register of Historic Places listings in San Benito County, California

References

External links
San Juan Bautista State Historic Park
Early History of the California Coast, a National Park Service Discover Our Shared Heritage Travel Itinerary
The following buildings in the district are documented in the Historic American Buildings Survey:

San Juan Bautista, California
History of San Benito County, California
The Californias
National Historic Landmarks in California
National Historic Landmarks in the San Francisco Bay Area
Historic American Buildings Survey in California
Historic American Landscapes Survey in California
Museums in San Benito County, California
Open-air museums in California
History museums in California
Protected areas established in 1933
National Register of Historic Places in San Benito County, California
Historic districts on the National Register of Historic Places in California
Parks on the National Register of Historic Places in California
State parks of California
Historic districts in California